Banksia arctotidis is a species of prostrate shrub that is endemic to the southwest of Western Australia. It has leaves that are pinnately divided to the midrib, cream-coloured flowers and hairy, egg-shaped fruit.

Description
The flower spikes are surrounded by hairy thread-like, egg-shaped and oblong bracts and are composed of between 75 and 100 individual flowers.

Taxonomy and naming
This banksia was first formally described in 1830 by Robert Brown who gave it the name Dryandra arctotidis and published the description in Supplementum primum Prodromi florae Novae Hollandiae. In 2007, Austin Mast and Kevin Thiele changed the name to Banksia arctotidis. The specific epithet (arctotidis) is a reference to the genus Arctotis.

Distribution and habitat
Banksia arctotidis grows on sandy soil in kwongan south from Kojonup and Ongerup through the Stirling Range National Park to near Albany.

Ecology
An assessment of the potential impact of climate change on this species found that its range is likely to contract by between 50% and 80% by 2080, depending on the severity of the change.

Conservation status
This banksia is classified as "not threatened" by the Western Australian Government Department of Parks and Wildlife.

References

 
 

arctotidis
Plants described in 1830
Endemic flora of Western Australia
Eudicots of Western Australia
Taxa named by Robert Brown (botanist, born 1773)
Taxa named by Kevin Thiele